Charles Daniel may refer to:
 Charles Daniel (sea captain) (died 1661), explorer of Canada
 Charles E. Daniel (1895–1964), United States Army officer
 Charles Daniel (Royal Navy officer) (1894–1981)
 Charles William Daniel (1871–1955), writer and publisher
 Chuck Daniel (1933–2008), American baseball player

See also
 
 Charles Daniels (disambiguation)
 Charlie Daniels (disambiguation)